List of Dominicans may refer to:
 List of people from the Dominican Republic
 List of people from Dominica
 List of people of the Dominican Order
 List of Dominican Americans